National Highway 163A, commonly called NH 163A is a national highway in  India. It is a spur road of National Highway 63. NH-163A traverses the state of Chhattisgarh in India.

Route 
Geedam - Dantewada

Junctions  
 
 Terminal near Geedam.

See also 

 List of National Highways in India by highway number

References

External links 

 NH 163A on OpenStreetMap

National highways in India
National Highways in Chhattisgarh